Colobothea assimilis is a species of beetle in the family Cerambycidae. It was described by Per Olof Christopher Aurivillius in 1902.

References

assimilis
Beetles described in 1902